Jamal Anwar (born 31 December 1990) is a Pakistani First-class cricketer. He is a wicketkeeper-batsman who bats right handed. He has represented Rawalpindi Rams, Federal Areas & Habib Bank. He has played  for Pakistan Under-19 and Pakistan under-25.

In January 2021, he was named in Northern's squad for the 2020–21 Pakistan Cup.

References

External links

1990 births
Cricketers from Rawalpindi
Living people
Pakistani cricketers
Rawalpindi cricketers
Habib Bank Limited cricketers
Sialkot cricketers
Rawalpindi Rams cricketers
Peshawar Zalmi cricketers
Wicket-keepers